Sini Tuuli Susanne Latvala (née Pöyry, born 3 February 1980 in Kankaanpää) is a retired female hammer thrower from Finland. Her personal best throw is 69.16 metres, achieved in July 2004 in Kaustinen. She was nicknamed "Sintsa".

Achievements

References

sports-reference

1980 births
Living people
People from Kankaanpää
Finnish female hammer throwers
Athletes (track and field) at the 2000 Summer Olympics
Athletes (track and field) at the 2004 Summer Olympics
Olympic athletes of Finland
Sportspeople from Satakunta